Luis Gustavo Cálix (born May 6, 1988, in Miami, Florida) is an American soccer player, currently playing for Parrillas One in the Honduran national league.

He has been called one of Miami FC's youngest prospects from Kendall SC. In high school Calix played for Gulliver Preparatory School.

Personal life
Cálix is the son of the Honduran football manager and former footballer Luis Enrique Cálix.

References

External links
Profile on Miami FC website

1988 births
Living people
Soccer players from Miami
American soccer players
American people of Honduran descent
Association football defenders
Miami FC (2006) players
Parrillas One players
USL First Division players
Liga Nacional de Fútbol Profesional de Honduras players